William P. Soules (born December 6, 1955 in Las Cruces, New Mexico) is an American politician and a Democratic member of the New Mexico Senate representing District 37 since January 15, 2013. He is vice-chair of the Senate Education Committee.

Education
Soules earned his BA and MA in psychology and his PhD from New Mexico State University where be became a member of Phi Kappa Tau fraternity.

Elections
 2012 – When District 37 Democratic Senator Stephen Fischmann left the legislature and left the seat open, Soules was unopposed for the June 5, 2012, Democratic primary, winning with 1,382 votes and won the November 6, 2012, general election with 9,330 votes (52.2%) against Republican nominee Cathey Jo Alberson.
 2016 – On March 26, Soules announced he would run for a second term. In his announcement, Soules said he would continue to focus on education and healthcare.

References

External links
Official page at the New Mexico Legislature

William P. Soules at Ballotpedia
William P. Soules at the National Institute on Money in State Politics

1955 births
Living people
Democratic Party New Mexico state senators
New Mexico State University alumni
Politicians from Las Cruces, New Mexico
21st-century American politicians